Peter James Cullinane  (born 29 November 1936), was the first Catholic bishop of Palmerston North. He was appointed as Bishop of Palmerston North by Pope John Paul II on 6 March 1980 and was consecrated on 23 April 1980. He established the Cathedral of the Holy Spirit (built in 1925, rededicated in 1980, renovated and added to in 1988) as his seat of operations. He retired on 22 February 2012. Cullinane College was named after him.

In 1990, Cullinane was awarded the New Zealand 1990 Commemoration Medal. In the 2006 New Year Honours, he was appointed a Companion of the New Zealand Order of Merit, for services to the community.

References

External links

 Catholic Hierarchy website, Bishop Peter James Cullinane (retrieved 23 February 2012).

1936 births
Living people
Holy Name Seminary alumni
20th-century Roman Catholic bishops in New Zealand
People from Dannevirke
People from Palmerston North
Companions of the New Zealand Order of Merit
21st-century Roman Catholic bishops in New Zealand
Roman Catholic bishops of Palmerston North